Boldklubben 1909, known as B1909, is a Danish association football club currently playing in the Denmark Series. They play at Gillested Park in Odense on Funen, which has a capacity of 6,000. Founded in 1909, the club spent a total 38 seasons in the Danish championship from 1912 to 1993, and won the 1959 and 1964 Danish 1st Division championships, as well as the 1962 and 1971 Danish Cup trophies.

In the 2006–07 season, the first team of B1909 merged with B 1913 and Dalum IF, to form FC Fyn. B 1909's new first team continued in the Danish league system, but had to stay two leagues below FC Fyn. In 2013, as FC Fyn was dissolved, the three mother clubs were reestablished in the lower leagues.

Honours
Danish Football Championship
Winners (2): 1959, 1964
Danish Cup
Winners (2): 1961–62, 1970–71
Runners-up (1): 1976–77
Provinsmesterskabsturneringen
Winners (1): 1931
Runners-up (1): 1926–27
Funen Football Championship
Winners (16): 1919–20, 1920–21, 1921–22, 1926–27, 1930–31, 1931–32, 1934–35, 1951–52‡, 1952–53‡, 1958‡, 1961‡, 1962‡, 1964‡, 1981‡, 2012–13R, 2016–17
Runners-up (24): 1916–17, 1917–18, 1918–19, 1922–23, 1923–24, 1928–29, 1929–30, 1932–33, 1933–34, 1935–36, 1941–42‡, 1946–47‡, 1947–48‡, 1955–56‡, 1956–57‡, 1959‡, 1960‡, 1963‡, 1974‡, 1979‡, 1980‡, 2011sR, 2011–12R, 2013–14, 2020–21
FBUs Pokalturnering
Winners (14) – record: 1921, 1922, 1923, 1928, 1930, 1936, 1938, 1940, 1941, 1942, 1943, 1944, 1950, 1953
Runners-up (9): 1920, 1924, 1927, 1932, 1939, 1947, 1948, 1949, 1952
‡: Honour achieved by reserve teamR: Status as a reserve team for FC Fyn

Achievements 
38 seasons in the Highest Danish League
38 seasons in the Second Highest Danish League
9 seasons in the Third Highest Danish League

References

External links 
 Official homepage
B 1909 at Danish Football Association

Association football clubs established in 1909
1909, Boldklubben
Sport in Odense
1909 establishments in Denmark